is a railway station located in the southern part of Itō, Shizuoka Prefecture, Japan operated by the private railroad company Izukyū Corporation.

Lines
Jōgasaki-Kaigan Station is served by the Izu Kyūkō Line, and is located 13.9 kilometers from the starting point of the line at Itō Station and 30.8 kilometers from Atami Station.

Station layout
The station has one ground-level side platform serving a single bi-directional track. The station is attended.

Adjacent stations

History 
Jōgasaki-Kaigan Station was opened on March 15, 1972. The station building was rebuilt as a log house in commemoration of 30th anniversary of the opening of the Izu Kyūkō Line in 1991.

Passenger statistics
In fiscal 2017, the station was used by an average of 374 passengers daily (boarding passengers only).

Surrounding area
 Jōgasaki beach
Japan National Route 135

See also
 List of Railway Stations in Japan

References

External links

 Official home page

Railway stations in Japan opened in 1972
Railway stations in Shizuoka Prefecture
Izu Kyūkō Line
Itō, Shizuoka